"Value, Price and Profit" (German: "Lohn, Preis und Profit") is a transcript of an English-language lecture series delivered to the First International Working Men's Association on June 20 and 27, 1865 by Karl Marx. The text was written between the end of May and June 27 in 1865, while Capital, Volume I was in preparation and one year before it was published. Value, Price and Profit was published as a book in 1898 by Marx's daughter Eleanor Marx Aveling.

In this polemic, Marx sought to refute the theoretical basis for the economic policy of Ricardian socialist John Weston. Weston said that "(1) that a general rise in the rate of wages would be of no use to the workers; (2) that therefore, etc., the trade unions have a harmful effect". In the process of criticizing Weston, Marx's explicates his theories of surplus value and the falling rate of profit in simple and concise English.

Synopsis
Marx argues that because there are economic laws governing the value of commodities as represented by the social relationship of wages and price, capitalists cannot raise or lower wages merely at their whim, nor can they raise prices at will in order to make up for lost profits resulting from an increase in wages. At the heart of the argument is the labour theory of value and the related premise that profit represents surplus value created by labour working above and beyond the amount needed to reproduce itself, as represented by wages and the buying power of wages viz. the price of commodities (particularly necessities). In other words, profit is what is left over after paying the worker a wage representing a certain portion of the labour performed, the remainder effectively being unpaid and reserved to the capitalist. 

Because this arrangement depends ultimately on the social conditions of labour and production, despite the existence of apparently natural laws governing the value of commodities, within these limits workers can organize around demanding a higher rate of pay at the expense of the profits of the capitalist, not at their own expense as argued by Weston, who claims that capitalists will simply raise prices in order to sell the same quantity of produce at a rate that will pay for the same quantity of labour, effectively cancelling out any wage gains won by workers through union activities. 

Marx argues that profit is derived not by selling commodities above their value, in which case capitalists could raise prices at whim, but that commodities sold at or near their natural value produce profit because workers are only paid for that portion of their work which pays for their own labour power, i.e. that labour which generates enough value to pay workers their wages. In this regard Marx distinguishes value as the natural price of a commodity through the labour power invested in it, which forms an upper limit to wages, and the rate of profit as the ratio between the surplus value left to the capitalist after paying the wage, and the wage itself, thus excluding investments in capital prior to production, and disregarding payments by capitalists in rent to landlords and interest to moneylenders which must come from surplus value after production. 

This ratio, the difference between the value created by the "last employed worker" and the wage paid to that worker, which constitutes Marx's use of the word "exploitation."

Marx concludes that as value is determined by labour, and as profit is the appropriated surplus value remaining after paying wages, that the maximum profit is set by the minimum wage necessary to sustain labour, but is in turn adjusted by the overall productive powers of labour using given tools and machines, the length of the workday, the intensity of work demanded, and the fluctuating prices of commodities such as metals and foodstuffs which determine how much a worker may purchase with wages expressed in money. All of these factors being a product of a given social arrangement, in this case the system of wage labour itself, the worker is left at the mercy of commodities and the cycles of capitalism, but not at the whim of the capitalists who pay their wages, who will lower wages during a decrease in the value of labour, but will resist efforts to increase wages during the cyclical upswings and despite any other factors which might increase the value of labour back to its average, natural level. 

Thus insisting that workers can not only exert pressure to increase their wages as a reflection of the value of their labour as a commodity, but must in fact organize to do so lest the inherent pressures of capitalism reduce them to "one level mass of broken wretches past salvation," Marx nonetheless declares unionism to be a conservative force so long as it restricts itself to a defensive preservation of what can only amount to historically average wages, without attempting to abolish the system of wage labour itself.

References

Marxist books
1865 speeches
1898 books
1898 in economics
Books by Karl Marx
Criticism of trade unions